Henri Sérandour (April 15, 1937 in Le Mans - November 12, 2009 in Dinard) was a former international water polo player. He was a past president of the French National Olympic Committee (CNOSF) during 16 years (1993-2009) and from 2000-2007, a member of the International Olympic Committee.

References

1937 births
2009 deaths
Sportspeople from Le Mans
International Olympic Committee members
French male water polo players
Presidents of the French Swimming Federation
20th-century French people